Bowland was a rural district in the West Riding of Yorkshire from 1894 to 1974.  It was named after the Forest of Bowland, which it included.

It was formed under the Local Government Act 1894 from that part of the Clitheroe rural sanitary district which was in Yorkshire (the rest becoming the Clitheroe Rural District in Lancashire).

The district was abolished in 1974 under the Local Government Act 1972.  It was united with the Clitheroe Rural District (and some other territory), as part of the Ribble Valley district in the non-metropolitan county of Lancashire.

Civil parishes
The district contained the following civil parishes during its existence:

References

https://web.archive.org/web/20070401161230/http://www.visionofbritain.org.uk/relationships.jsp?u_id=10061830&c_id=10001043

Districts of England created by the Local Government Act 1894
Districts of England abolished by the Local Government Act 1972
Rural districts of the West Riding of Yorkshire
Forest of Bowland